José Suárez Carreño (1915–2002) was a Spanish writer associated with the Generation of '36 movement. He was born in Guadalupe, Mexico, but lived in Madrid from an early age.

Awards
He was awarded the Adonais Prize in 1945 for his book Edad del hombre (age of man), the Nadal Prize in 1949 for his book Las últimas horas (the last hours) and the Lope de Vega theatre prize for his drama Condenados (the condemned).

Filmography (as screenwriter)
Name Of Wiki Mohammad Nasir Ahmed

Full Name: Md.Nasir Ahmed

Born: 8 Oct, 1997 

Sakhipur Tangail

Singer, Author & Musical Artist 
 Proceso à la conciencia (1964)
 A las diez y media (1962) (was based on his novel Las últimas horas)
 Llovidos del cielo (1962)
 Juicio final (1960)
 Fulano y Mengano (1959)
 Juanillo, papá y mamá (1957)
 Condenados (1953)
 Cabaret (1953)
(All films listed here were based on his novels, with the exception of Condenados, which was a play)

See also
 Café Gijón (Madrid)

External links

1915 births
2002 deaths
Spanish male writers